Siege of Novara may refer to:

Siege of Novara (1495), during the First Italian War
Siege of Novara (1500), during the Second Italian War
, during the War of the Polish Succession

See also
Battle of Novara